Henry Stallings II (December 30, 1950 – September 7, 2015) was a member of the Michigan State Senate. He represented one of the districts in Detroit.

In 1998 he investigated for allegations he had used state employees to do work at his art gallery and paid them with state funds. Though the Ethics Committee recommended expulsion, he pled guilty to a misdemeanor and resigned before a full expulsion vote could be taken.

In 2002 he ran again for the state house, but lost to Virgil Smith, Jr. in the Democratic primary. Convicted of misuse of a staffers time.

References

Sources
Detroit Free Press, Aug 2, 2009, p. 6A

1950 births
2015 deaths
Democratic Party Michigan state senators
Politicians from Detroit
Politicians from San Diego
Michigan politicians convicted of crimes
African-American state legislators in Michigan
20th-century African-American people
21st-century African-American people